Oscar Fritz Schuh (15 January 1904 – 22 October 1984) was a German-Austrian opera director, theatre director and opera manager. He is known for directing Mozart operas at the Vienna State Opera and the Salzburg Festival in productions that toured internationally. They focused on the psychology of the characters.

Life and career 
Schuh was born in  Munich, the son of a veterinarian. During his schooling, he already had a contract as a theatre critic for the Berlin magazine Der Fechter, and also wrote essays about theatre history and reviews for other papers. He studied art history and philosophy at Munich University. In 1923, he was engaged at the Bayerische Landesbühne in Augsburg.

His first theatre direction there was Hauptmann's Hanneles Himmelfahrt. He moved on to Oldenburg, Osnabrück, Staatstheater Darmstadt,  (with Walter Bruno Iltz), and Prague. In 1931, he was called by Albert Ruch to work as director and dramaturge at the Hamburg State Opera. He there met the stage designer Caspar Neher who became his professional partner. When Ruch succeeded Karl-Heinz Strohm at the Vienna State Opera, Schuh and Neher went along. They developed the so-called Wiener Mozart-Stil (Vienna Mozart Style) together with the conductors Karl Böhm and Josef Krips, with a focus on the psychology of the characters. Schuh's production, with Böhm, of Così fan tutte set a standard for later versions of the opera. The  successfully toured to Florence, Nice, Paris, Brussels, Amsterdam and London.

Schuh also worked at the Vienna Burgtheater. He also directed for audio plays, including a 1956 production by RIAS of Goldoni's Mirandolina. In 1958, he moved to be Generalintendant (general manager) of the Städtische Bühnen Köln, and finally, in 1963, succeeded Gustaf Gründgens as general manager of the Deutsches Schauspielhaus in Hamburg, holding the position until 1968.

He then worked freelance. In the 1970s, he founded the Salzburger Straßentheater, which he directed, together with his wife, the stage designer and painter , until his death.

Awards 
Among other awards, Schuh received the Deutscher Kritikerpreis in 1956, and the Salzburg Mozart Medal in 1966.

Publications 
 Oscar Fritz Schuh: So war es – war es so? Notizen und Erinnerungen eines Theatermannes.

References

Cited sources

External links 
 
 
 Oscar Fritz Schuh geschichtewiki.wien.gv

1904 births
1984 deaths
Theatre people from Munich
Dramaturges
German opera directors
German theatre directors
Commanders Crosses of the Order of Merit of the Federal Republic of Germany